Nupserha laterifuga is a species of beetle in the family Cerambycidae. It was described by Chevrolat in 1855.

Varietas
 Nupserha laterifuga var. frontalis (Jordan, 1894)
 Nupserha laterifuga var. apicebrunnea Breuning, 1950
 Nupserha laterifuga var. nigrifrons Lepesme & Breuning, 1953
 Nupserha laterifuga var. frontemaculata Breuning, 1958
 Nupserha laterifuga var. rutshurensis Breuning, 1952
 Nupserha laterifuga var. anticemaculata Breuning, 1950

References

laterifuga
Beetles described in 1855